Ivan Mikhailovich Shepetov (11 July 1902  21 May 1943) was a Soviet infantry officer who enlisted in the Red Army as a Civil War volunteer in 1918 and rose to command the 96th Mountain Rifle Division in the months following the German invasion of the Soviet Union.

World War II
Promoted to major-general and awarded the title Hero of the Soviet Union in autumn 1941 for his capable handling of the 96th Mountain Rifle Division on the Southwestern Front, Shepetov continued to command the division (redesignated as the 14th Guards Rifle Division) until 29 May 1942, when he was wounded and taken prisoner in the German encirclement near the town of Izyum.

Transferred between various prisoner camps after falling into German hands, Shepetov was shot while attempting to escape from the Flossenbürg concentration camp in May 1943.

Surviving Soviet war prisoners held at Flossenbürg stated that they had witnessed Shepetov's torture at Flossenbürg in the spring of 1943.

References

1902 births
1943 deaths
Communist Party of the Soviet Union members
People who died in Flossenbürg concentration camp
Heroes of the Soviet Union
Military personnel who died in Nazi concentration camps
People from Kamianske
People of the Russian Civil War
Recipients of the Order of Lenin
Recipients of the Order of the Red Banner
Soviet major generals
Soviet military personnel killed in World War II
Soviet prisoners of war
Ukrainian people of World War II
Deaths by firearm in Germany
Frunze Military Academy alumni